Benzylthiouracil (BTU) is an antithyroid preparation. It is a thioamide, closely related to propylthiouracil.

Adverse effects
Benzylthiouracil has been associated with severe adverse effects, notably vasculitis and subsequent ANCA-positive glomerulonephritis, as well as isolated reports of lung damage.

References

Antithyroid drugs
Pyrimidines
Thioureas
Nucleobases